This is a list of casual dining restaurant chains around the world, arranged in alphabetical order. A casual dining restaurant is a restaurant that serves moderately priced food in a casual atmosphere. Except for buffet-style restaurants and, more recently, fast casual restaurants, casual dining restaurants usually provide table service.

Casual

Fast casual

Nearly defunct former casual restaurant chains 
This list contains chains that were much larger in the past, with some having several hundred locations at their peak, which have since been reduced to a single location.

Defunct chains

See also 

 Fast casual restaurant
 List of defunct restaurants of the United States
 List of buffet restaurants
 List of coffeehouse chains
 List of fast food restaurant chains
 List of hamburger restaurants
 List of ice cream parlor chains
 List of pizza chains
 List of restaurant chains
 Lists of restaurants
 List of revolving restaurants
 Types of restaurant

References 

Casual